"Just Sayin'" is a song recorded by Canadian country group James Barker Band. The song was written by the band's lead singer James Barker, along with Travis Wood, Gavin Slate and producer Todd Clark. It was the second single from the band's debut extended play Game On.

Background
James Barker said that after their debut single "Lawn Chair Lazy", which he classified as a "chill, summer-style song", the band "wanted to do something a little more upbeat". He called the song "a blast to play live".

Commercial performance
"Just Sayin'" reached a peak of number seven on the Billboard Canada Country chart, becoming the band's second consecutive top ten hit after making their debut with "Lawn Chair Lazy". It has been certified Gold by Music Canada.

Music video
The official music video was for "Just Sayin'" premiered on ET Canada on November 8, 2016, and features a cameo appearance by ET's Rick Campanelli. The video features a man trying to talk to different women at a bar while James Barker Band performs on the stage.

Charts

Certifications

References

2016 songs
2016 singles
James Barker Band songs
Songs written by James Barker (singer)
Songs written by Todd Clark
Songs written by Gavin Slate
Songs written by Travis Wood (songwriter)
Song recordings produced by Todd Clark
Universal Music Canada singles